Hensmania turbinata is a species of herb in the family Asphodelaceae, first described in by Stephan Endlicher as Xerotes turbinata, and transferred to the genus, Hensmania, in 1903 by William Vincent Fitzgerald. 

This is a tufted herb where the major photosynthesis occurs in the stems. It flowers from November to January and fruits from December to February.

It is found between Serpentine and Cataby, in south-western Western Australia, growing on deep sandy soil in banksia woodland.

References

Hemerocallidoideae
Endemic flora of Australia
Flora of Western Australia
Taxa named by William Vincent Fitzgerald
Plants described in 1846
Taxa named by Stephan Endlicher